Robin Kačaniklić (born 25 August 1988) is a Swedish footballer who plays for Real Åstorp FF as a midfielder. He is older brother to the former Swedish national team player Alexander Kačaniklić.

References

External links
 
 Robin Kacaniklic at Fotbolltransfers
 

1988 births
Living people
Sportspeople from Helsingborg
Swedish footballers
Swedish people of Serbian descent
Helsingborgs IF players
Mjällby AIF players
FK Teleoptik players
Serbian First League players
Expatriate footballers in Serbia
Expatriate footballers in Norway
Association football midfielders